The 1958 South Carolina gubernatorial election was held on November 4, 1958 to select the governor of the state of South Carolina. Ernest Hollings won the Democratic primary against rival Donald S. Russell and ran unopposed in the general election becoming the 106th governor.

Democratic primary
The South Carolina Democratic Party held their primary for governor in the summer of 1958 and it became a heated contest between Lieutenant Governor Ernest Hollings and the former president of the University of South Carolina, Donald S. Russell. Hollings emerged victorious from the runoff and effectively became the next governor of South Carolina because there was no opposition in the general election.

General election
The general election was held on November 4, 1958 and Ernest Hollings was elected the next governor of South Carolina without opposition. Being a non-presidential election and few contested races, turnout was much lower than the Democratic primary election.

 

|-
| 
| colspan=5 |Democratic hold
|-

See also
Governor of South Carolina
List of governors of South Carolina
South Carolina gubernatorial elections

References

"Supplemental Report of the Secretary of State to the General Assembly of South Carolina." Reports and Resolutions of South Carolina to the General Assembly of the State of South Carolina. Volume I. Columbia, South Carolina: 1959, p. 8.

External links
SCIway Biography of Governor Ernest Frederick Hollings

1958
1958 United States gubernatorial elections
Gubernatorial
Sou